Birgitta Margareta Wängberg (later Axsäter, born 29 December 1939) is a retired Swedish freestyle swimmer. She competed at the 1956 Summer Olympics in the 400 m and 4×100 m events and finished sixth in the relay.

References

1939 births
Living people
Olympic swimmers of Sweden
Swimmers at the 1956 Summer Olympics
Swedish female freestyle swimmers
Stockholms KK swimmers
Swimmers from Stockholm